Why There Are Mountains is an independently released studio album by the indie rock band Cymbals Eat Guitars. The album was initially self-released, then re-released after the band signed to Sister's Den Records in late 2009. The LP version of the album is currently only available via Insound.

Track listing

Personnel
The following people contributed to Why There Are Mountains

Cymbals Eat Guitars
 Daniel Baer – keyboards, piano
 Neil Berenholz – Bass
 Joseph D'agostino – guitar, vocals, composer
 Matthew Miller – drums, percussion

Recording personnel
 Kyle "Slick" Johnson – engineer, mixing, percussion, producer
 Dave McNair – mastering

Additional personnel
 Elizabeth Dotson-Westphalen – trombone
 Matt Gasiorowski – trumpet
 Marika Hughes – cello
 Megan Weeder – violin
 Lizzy Yoder – vocals

Reception

Why There Are Mountains received mostly positive reviews from critics. The album currently has a 78 out of 100 rating on the review aggregate site Metacritic, which indicates "generally favorable reviews."

Ian Cohen of Pitchfork Media gave the album an 8.3/10, writing "Why There Are Mountains ends up being like any great result of wanderlust—here, the journey is the end not the means; fortunately, that gives Why There Are Mountains astounding replay value." The album also received a "Best New Music" designation in the review.

The album has appeared on a few end-of-year albums lists. Pitchfork Media named Why There Are Mountains the 43rd best album of 2009. It was also named the number one album of the year on The Daily Cardinal's list of the Top 15 Albums of 2009.

References

External links
 Cymbals Eat Guitars website

2009 albums
Self-released albums